Lenoy Jones (born September 9, 1974) is a former professional American football player who played linebacker for seven seasons for the Houston/Tennessee Oilers and Cleveland Browns.

Personal life
He is married to LaJuana Jones and is the father of five boys. Lenoy is a history teacher at Midway High School and football coach at Midway in Central Texas. His son Lenoy Jones Jr. plays linebacker for the Baylor Bears.

External links
Lenoy Jones profile at NFL
Lenoy Jones stats at The Pro Football Archives

1974 births
Living people
American football linebackers
TCU Horned Frogs football players
Houston Oilers players
Tennessee Oilers players
Cleveland Browns players